Georgios Liologlou (1805?−1920) was a Greek revolutionary of the Greek War of Independence.

Biography 
Liologlou claimed to have been born in 1805 in Isaakio of Evros. He participated in the uprising of the inhabitants of the Didymoteicho region during the Greek Revolution of 1821, which ended as a failure in Thrace after the defeat of the revolutionary forces in the Battle of Saltikio (now Lavara). Following the complete destruction of his home town, Isaakio, by the Ottoman forces under Hadjiestrev Agha, he and his grandfather were reduced to work as the Agha's serfs, after the possessions of Greek inhabitants of the village were confiscated. He later was a priest in Didymoteicho.

He died in 1920 at the claimed age of 115, just after Western Thrace, including his home town, had become incorporated into Greece.

Notes

References

Sources 
 Αδαμάντιος Ταμβακίδης, Γυμνασιάρχης, Παράρτημα, Γ' τόμος, «Θρακικά», p. 62

1805 births
1920 deaths
Greek people of the Greek War of Independence
Longevity claims
Greek supercentenarians
People from Didymoteicho